The Isle of Wight Bus & Coach Museum, also referred to as The Isle of Wight Bus Museum, was founded in 1997 in Newport on the Isle of Wight in the United Kingdom.

The museum is a registered charity and run completely by volunteers. The vehicle collection is currently housed in the former bus depot at Ryde, Isle of Wight.

The museum hosts two bus rallies of its own. There is one event in May, running day. and another in October which features many buses from around the country.

Vehicles on display

The Isle of Wight Bus Museum currently has 21 vehicles on display at its new premises at Ryde.

Relocation

By the end of 2010, the museum was planning to relocate and construct a new purpose-built unit to house an Island Road Transport Museum. The move is necessary due to the building it currently uses being demolished as part of redevelopment of Newport Quay. The plan was to purchase a two and a half acre area of farmland adjoining Havenstreet Railway, with the new site covering twice the floor area that the current base offers. The plans would require £120,000 to be raised to fund the move. Supporters were invited to purchase £250 shares in the project with monies being returned if the plan failed. However, in addition to funding issues, the field formed part of the Isle of Wight AONB, which could have led to a battle for planning consent over redevelopment.

Since 2015 the museum has been based at a former Southern Vectis depot, located in Park Road, Ryde, Isle of Wight. which houses and displays the museum's collection of buses and coaches.

Photo gallery

References

External links 

 
 VIP Ghost Investigations: Isle of Wight Bus Museum

Bus museums in England
Museums on the Isle of Wight
Museums established in 1997
Transport on the Isle of Wight